Erik Næsbak Brenden (born 7 January 1994) is a Norwegian footballer who plays for Jerv.

He signed for the club on 27 January 2022.

References

1994 births
Living people
Norwegian footballers
Norway youth international footballers
Norwegian First Division players
Eliteserien players
Nybergsund IL players
Lillestrøm SK players
Sandefjord Fotball players
FK Jerv players
Association football midfielders
People from Elverum
Sportspeople from Innlandet